Redha Shaaban (born 18 September 1963) is a Kuwaiti weightlifter. He competed at the 1992 Summer Olympics and the 1996 Summer Olympics.

References

1963 births
Living people
Kuwaiti male weightlifters
Olympic weightlifters of Kuwait
Weightlifters at the 1992 Summer Olympics
Weightlifters at the 1996 Summer Olympics
Place of birth missing (living people)